Ridgedale may refer to:

 Ridgedale, Hampshire County, West Virginia
 Ridgedale, Monongalia County, West Virginia, an unincorporated community in Monongalia County, West Virginia